Rajya Praja Sammelan (translation: State Popular Conference) was a political party in the Kingdom of Sikkim, founded after the Independence of India in 1947. It advocated a union with India and the Gorkha, (Nepali) population of northern West Bengal. In 1960, Praja Sammelan merged with Dorjee's Sikkim National Congress.

Defunct political parties in Sikkim
1947 establishments in India
Political parties established in 1947
Political parties disestablished in 1960
1960 disestablishments in India